Frank Jacob Chamberlin (January 2, 1978 – November 17, 2013) was an American football linebacker. Chamberlin attended Mahwah High School, in Mahwah, New Jersey. He was a four-year letterman and two-year starter for Boston College who made 126 tackles as a senior, earning second-team All-Big East honors.  He also won the team's Scanlan Award, the highest honor for a B.C. football player.  

Chamberlin was drafted by the Tennessee Titans in the fifth round (160th overall) of the 2000 NFL Draft. He played in 43 games for the Titans from 2000 to 2002. He later played for the Cincinnati Bengals (2003) and Houston Texans (2005). He played a total of 57 games in the NFL, making a total of 45 combined tackles, one sack and two forced fumbles. He died on November 17, 2013, aged 35, after a year-long battle against brain cancer.

References

External links
NFL Player profile
ESPN.com profile

1978 births
2013 deaths
Mahwah High School alumni
People from Mahwah, New Jersey
Sportspeople from Los Angeles County, California
American football linebackers
Tennessee Titans players
Cincinnati Bengals players
Houston Texans players
Boston College Eagles football players
Deaths from brain cancer in the United States
Players of American football from New Jersey